A statue of Alexander von Humboldt is installed on the exterior of Jordan Hall, in Stanford University's Main Quad, in the U.S. state of California.

See also

 Statue of Alexander von Humboldt (Begas), Berlin

References

Alexander von Humboldt
Outdoor sculptures in California
Sculptures of men in California
Stanford University buildings and structures
Statues in California